Zahir Qasmi Urdu: قاری ظاہر قاسمی (2 August 1922  4 September 1988) was a qari (reciter of the Qur'an), mainly known for his qira'at (technique of recitation).

Background
Zahir Qasmi had a very unique honour for  Qur’an recitation. On August 14/15 1947, day of independence of Pakistan, Qari Zahir Qasmi recited on Radio Pakistan for the country. He also established a Qira’at Institution in early 50’s in Pakistan called “Darul-Quran, Jamia Qasima” in lazvella, Karachi. In 1966/1967, Qari Zahir Qasmi was the secretary general of the International Qur'an Recitation Association and he attended both international Qira'at conferences.  He had gained a lot of popularity in the late 1970s, and the early 1980s. Qari Zahir Qasmi died on September 4, 1988 in the state of Virginia (United States).

There is a 'Qari Zahir Qasmi Road' in Karachi, Pakistan named after him.

From the Dawn newspaper's archives 50 years ago, "On June 11, 1970 it was reported that the Mohajir representatives of Karachi had decided to form a political party  the Pakistan Mohajir Front... The meeting also decided to make Maulana Zahir Qasmi its convener, and to appoint a committee consisting of Maulana Qasmi, Hamid Husain Farooqui (advocate), Ziaul Hasan Chishti (advocate), Dr Safdar Farooqui, M. Ghulam Murtaza and SM Sohail to prepare the constitution of the party".

Above quote from the Dawn newspaper archives makes it obvious that Zahir Qasmi was highly active politically and socially in Karachi more than 50 years ago.

Awards and recognition
Sitara-i-Imtiaz (Star of Excellence) Award by the Government of Pakistan
Pride of Performance Award by the President of Pakistan

References

External links
 A History of Radio Pakistan on GoogleBooks
http://www.iqrabd.org/update/

1922 births
1988 deaths
Pakistani Quran reciters
Pakistani radio personalities
Pakistani television personalities
Pakistani expatriates in the United States